Super Destroyer and similar may mean:

In professional wrestling
 "The Super Destroyer" Hulk Hogan
 "The Super Destroyers" from WCWA - tag team wrestling team
 "Super Destroyer #2" Bill Irwin
 "Super Destroyer #1" Scott Irwin
 "Super Destroyer" Don Jardine
 "The Super Destroyers" from ECW - tag team wrestling team
 "Super Destroyer #1" A. J. Petrucci
 "Super Destroyer #2" Doug Stahl
 "Super Destroyer" Gary Royal
 "Super Destroyer Mark II" Sgt. Slaughter
 "Super Destroyer 2000" Bison Smith
 "The Super Destroyer" Jack Victory

In fiction
 SD Lucifer a "superdestroyer", see Lucifer_in_popular_culture

Ships
Some ships are informally described as "super-destroyers":
 Destroyer leader subtype of destroyers
 
  (large destroyers)
 Type 1936A destroyer